The Westminster Synagogue is a non-affiliated Jewish Reform synagogue and congregation near Hyde Park, London. It is located in Kent House, a restored Victorian town house in Knightsbridge. The building, which dates from the late 1800s, also houses the Czech Memorial Scrolls Centre.

History
The congregation was founded in 1957 by Rabbi Harold Reinhart, who resigned from his position as Senior Minister of the West London Synagogue and, accompanied by 80 former members of that synagogue, established the New London Jewish Congregation. Shortly afterwards it was renamed Westminster Synagogue.

The congregation's earliest services were held at Caxton Hall, Westminster, from whose location the Synagogue derives its name. In 1960 the congregation acquired Kent House opposite Hyde Park in Knightsbridge. Kent House was built in 1872–4 for Louisa Baring, Lady Ashburton. In 1909, Sir Saxton Noble acquired the house: in 1959, his son sold the building, before it was acquired by the synagogue congregation. The building provided room for a synagogue, accommodation for congregational activities and a flat for the rabbi.

Westminster Synagogue has, in religious terms, remained largely in tune with the Reform movement in Britain. Although not affiliated to the Movement for Reform Judaism, Westminster Synagogue is served by the Movement's Bet Din and has links with the West London Synagogue's burial facilities. The congregation does not have a system of seat rentals and aims to give equality to all members. Women play a full part in congregational life.

Rabbi Reinhart died in 1969 and was succeeded by Rabbi Chaim Stern. Rabbi Stern's tenure was brief and he was succeeded by Rabbi Albert Friedlander in 1971. Rabbi Friedlander, who retired in 1997, combined his ministry for some years with his post as Director of Rabbinical Studies at the Leo Baeck College.

Rabbi Thomas Salamon succeeded Rabbi Friedlander in 1997. He had previously served as Associate Rabbi at West London Synagogue (1972–1975).  In 2014, Rabbi Salamon was awarded a doctorate from the University of Budapest in 2014. Rabbi Salamon was succeeded, in 2017, by Rabbi Benji Stanley.

Memorial Scrolls Trust

Westminster Synagogue has been closely involved with the Memorial Scrolls Trust, which holds and cares for a collection of scrolls collected from Jewish communities in Bohemia and Moravia during the Second World War by the Jewish Museum of Prague.  This collection was acquired by Westminster Synagogue in 1964. A small museum in Kent House displays the work of the Trust and tells the history of the scrolls. It is open to the public on Tuesdays and Thursdays 10 am to 4 pm (excluding Jewish & public holidays). For further information about the Trust, a comprehensive website is available.

See also
 List of Jewish communities in the United Kingdom
 List of former synagogues in the United Kingdom

References

External links
Westminster Synagogue

Synagogues in London
1957 establishments in England
Buildings and structures in the City of Westminster
Jewish organizations established in 1957
Reform synagogues in the United Kingdom
Religion in the City of Westminster